Charles Delbert Hosemann Jr. (born June 30, 1947) is an American politician serving as the 33rd lieutenant governor of Mississippi, since January 2020. From 2008 to 2020, he served as the secretary of state of Mississippi.

Early life
Hosemann was born in Vicksburg in western Mississippi. He received his Bachelor of Business Administration degree in 1969 from the University of Notre Dame in South Bend, Indiana. In 1972, he earned his Juris Doctor from the University of Mississippi School of Law in Oxford, Mississippi. In 1973, he obtained specialization in Taxation at New York University.  Hosemann lives in the capital city of Jackson, where he is a partner with Phelps Dunbar LLP.

Secretary of State of Mississippi (2008–2020)
In the Republican primary election on August 7, 2007, Hosemann received 54 percent of the vote, defeating former mayor of Columbus Jeffrey Rupp and State Representative Mike Lott of Petal. In the general election on November 6, 2007, Hosemann defeated Democrat Robert Smith in the race for Secretary of State. He became the first Republican Secretary of State for Mississippi since James Hill in 1878.

He took office on January 10, 2008, succeeding Democrat Eric Clark. During the campaign, he took advantage of his unusual name in order to gain name recognition. A series of commercials showed an elderly woman talking about the good things he would do as Secretary of State, meanwhile forgetting his name as he tried to correct her. She typically used similar names such as Gilbert, Albert, Philbert, Dilbert, and Herbert. Since then, various public service messages, such as a reminder to go vote during election season, have included this format, the woman talking about the importance of voting, then mispronouncing Hosemann's name, then Hosemann correcting her and continuing the reminder.

The Mississippi Legislature had officially ratified the 13th Amendment in 1995, but the Secretary of State's office had failed to officially notify the National Archives at that time. Doctors Ranjan Batra and Ken Sullivan of the University of Mississippi Medical Center noticed the oversight in 2013 and informed Hosemann, who quickly submitted the appropriate documentation. This action made Mississippi the 36th and most-recent state to ratify the 13th Amendment.

Lieutenant Governor of Mississippi (2020–Present)
Hosemann ran for lieutenant governor of Mississippi in the 2019 Mississippi general election. In the Republican primary, he defeated  Shane Quick and won the Republican nomination for lieutenant governor. In the general election, Hosemann defeated Democrat Jay Hughes, a member of the Mississippi House of Representatives. He was sworn-in to the office on January 9, 2020.

During his run for lieutenant governor, he announced his plans, in which he told reporters that he wanted to increase teachers' pay, expand the learning program for pre-K students, and increase funding for special needs students. He also wanted to make career and technical training more available for high school students and jobs and skills training more available for prison inmates. He supported increased infrastructure spending without new taxes, and he also supported raising the statewide gas tax. He also wanted to reduce state agencies' spending and reinvest the cut spending into education and infrastructure, and he also wanted to raise state employees' pay. He has appointed 13 of the 16 Democrats in the Mississippi State Senate to committee chairmanships.

Mississippi state flag
Hosemann initially supported changing the state flag by referendum. After the murder of George Floyd, Hosemann declared his support for a new state flag and supported legislative action to retire the old state flag, which bore the Confederate battle emblem. He said "It is time for this controversy to be resolved. I believe the flag which represents me and my grandchildren should reflect all of our citizens’ collective future, as determined by those who will live under that banner."

Political involvement
Hosemann was a candidate for election to the Mississippi's 4th congressional district in 1998. Hosemann drew criticism from another contender in that race, state Rep. Ken Stribling, for supporting former Democratic Gov. Ray Mabus in his 1987 election. 

After the resignation of Senator Thad Cochran in March 2018, it was speculated that Governor Bryant would name Hosemann as Cochran's successor, but eventually Bryant appointed Commissioner of Agriculture and Commerce Cindy Hyde-Smith instead.

In 2018, at the Neshoba County Fair, Hosemann announced he would not seek re-election for Secretary of State in 2019.

In 2019, Hosemann announced his candidacy for Lt. Governor.

Hosemann was a Democrat before switching parties and winning office.

Personal life
Hosemann is married to Lynn L. Hosemann, and together they have three children.

Electoral history

External links
Lieutenant Governor Delbert Hosemann
Delbert Hosemann for Lieutenant Governor 
Phelps Dunbar Attorney Profile

References

|-

1947 births
Living people
Politicians from Vicksburg, Mississippi
Lieutenant Governors of Mississippi
Secretaries of State of Mississippi
Mississippi lawyers
Mississippi Republicans
2000 United States presidential electors
New York University School of Law alumni
University of Mississippi School of Law alumni
University of Notre Dame alumni
20th-century American lawyers
21st-century American lawyers
20th-century American politicians
21st-century American politicians